Beroea was an Illyrian queen, and wife of Glaukias, king of the Taulantii. She came from the ruling Molossian Aeacidae dynasty of Epirus. She raised Pyrrhus of Epirus when he was adopted by Glaukias.

References

Bibliography

4th-century BC Greek people
4th-century BC Greek women
Ancient Epirote princesses
Pyrrhus of Epirus
Illyrian queens